The SIAI-Marchetti SM.1019 is an Italian STOL liaison monoplane built by SIAI-Marchetti for the Italian Army. It is a turboprop-powered derivative of the Cessna O-1 Bird Dog.

Development

To meet an Italian Army requirement for a short take-off liaison aircraft, SIAI-Marchetti modified the design of the Cessna 305A/O-1 Bird Dog with a new turboprop engine and a revised tail unit. The prototype first flew on 24 May 1969 powered by a 317 hp (236 kW) Allison 250-B15C turboprop engine. It was evaluated against the Aermacchi AM.3 and was successful and won a production order for 80 aircraft.

Variants
SM.1019
Prototype with 317hp (236kW) Allison 250-B15C turboprop engine, one built
SM.1019A 
Production with 317hp (236kW) Allison 250-B15G 400hp turboprop engine derated to 317hp, 81 built
SM.1019B 
Production variant with 400hp (298kW) Allison 250-B17B turboprop engine, designated SM.1019E.I by the Italian Army, four built

Operators

 Italian Army
 
 Somali Air Force – 6 in 1981, all retired.

Accidents and incidents
On 24 July 2021, former US Navy F-14 pilot Dale "Snort" Snodgrass fatally crashed in an SM.1019B with the registration N28U at Lewiston–Nez Perce County Airport in Lewiston, Idaho. The probable cause of the accident was, according to the NTSB report,  failure to remove the flight control lock, which immobilized flight control surfaces.

Specifications (SM.1019A)

See also

References

External links

1960s Italian military utility aircraft
SM.1019
Single-engined tractor aircraft
Aircraft first flown in 1969
STOL aircraft
Single-engined turboprop aircraft